

Parties represented in the Legislative Assembly

Other registered parties

Historical parties
 Co-operative Commonwealth Federation
 Aboriginal People's Party
 First Nations Party of Saskatchewan
 Progressive Party of Saskatchewan
 Non-Partisan League
 New Green Alliance
 Saskatchewan Democratic Action Party
 Saskatchewan Marijuana Party
 Labor-Progressive Party (Communist)
 Unity (Communist)
 Communist Party of Saskatchewan
 Alliance
 Social Credit Party of Saskatchewan
 Economic Group
 Unionest Party
 Western Canada Concept Party of Saskatchewan
 Western Independence Party of Saskatchewan

Unregistered parties
Prairie Freedom Alliance Party

See also
Elections Saskatchewan
List of Saskatchewan general elections

References

External links
 Registered Political Parties (As of September 23, 2011)

 
Parties
Saskatchewan

fr:Partis politiques canadiens#Saskatchewan